Action 52 is an unlicensed, multicart video game compilation developed by Active Enterprises for the Nintendo Entertainment System, and by FarSight Technologies for the Sega Genesis. The NES version was released in 1991, followed by the Genesis version in 1993. The multicart consists of 52 games in a variety of genres, mostly scrolling shooters and platformers. The "featured" game is The Cheetahmen, which was part of Active's attempt to create a franchise similar to the Teenage Mutant Ninja Turtles. Active Enterprises was legally incorporated in the Bahamas, but the offices and development were located in Miami, Florida while the company's product warehousing was located in Orlando, Florida.

The NES version of Action 52 became infamous among gamers for the poor quality and functionality of its games; it is often considered to be one of the worst games of all time. The Genesis version is widely considered superior, though still of subpar quality. Many video game collectors value Action 52 for its notoriety and rarity. It initially retailed for the comparatively high price of US$199.

Gameplay

NES

The NES version of Action 52 includes games that cover a variety of genres, the most common types being vertical shooters set in outer space, and platformers. The games have major programming flaws. Some of them freeze or crash; other issues include incomplete or endless levels, confusing design, and unresponsive controls.

Each game is given a brief description in the manual for Action 52. Some of the descriptions cover games from the early development of Action 52 that were very different from the games of corresponding titles; for example, Jigsaw is described as a game involving a jigsaw puzzle, but the game titled as such on the final product is a platformer involving a construction worker avoiding construction tools.

The Cheetahmen is the featured game of Action 52, and was intended to launch a multimedia franchise and an accompanying line of merchandise. A Cheetahmen animated television series, a comic book series and T-shirts were planned. An advertisement for action figures, which included concept art, appeared in a promotional comic book included in the Action 52 package. However, these plans were eventually scrapped due to the extremely negative reception Action 52 received.

Active Enterprises advertised a contest involving Ooze, one of the games of Action 52. Players who could complete Level 6 of the game could enter a drawing for $104,000 ($52,000 cash, and a scholarship with the same value). Ooze was reported to consistently crash on Level 2; therefore, it was impossible to qualify for the contest without using an emulator; after the contest had been cancelled, a second version of Action 52 was released which fixed this crashing problem, among some others.

The opening sequence of the NES version uses a Yeah! Woo! drum break sampled from Rob Base and DJ E-Z Rock's song "It Takes Two".

Sega Genesis

Few of the games from the NES version of Action 52 appear in the Sega Genesis version; although many of the titles have been retained, the games themselves have been rebuilt from scratch for the most part. For example, Haunted Hills appears in both versions, but the player character's gender is different (female in the NES version and male in the Genesis version), as is the setting, which is inside a haunted house in the NES version, and outside of one in the Genesis version. In the Genesis version of The Cheetahmen, the titular characters rescue cheetah cubs from Dr. Morbis and his minions.

Many - though not all - of the numerous technical issues with the NES version have been fixed in the Genesis version, which also takes advantage of the Genesis's superior hardware. Each game is color-coded on the main menu screen; "Beginner" games are green, "Intermediate" games are purple, "Expert" games are yellow, "Challenge" games are white, and multiplayer games are blue. The 52nd game, also titled Challenge, consists of a random sequence of the highest levels of the other single-player games. Also included in the Genesis version are the Randomizer, which selects a game at random, and a music demo mode.

Development
The creator of Action 52 was Vince Perri, a businessman from Miami, Florida, and the owner and founder of Active Enterprises. According to Perri, "I happened to see my son playing an illegal product made in Taiwan that had 40 games on it. The whole neighborhood went crazy over it ... I figured I'd do it legally. It's obvious when you see something like that, you know there's something there". Perri met Mario González at a recording studio in Miami, Florida where González was working as a sound engineer. He overheard Perri talking to the owner of the studio about him wanting to create a cartridge similar to the bootleg one his son had that contained 52 original games. González informed Perri that he and his friends, Javier Pérez and Albert Hernández, were into making games; the trio created a Tetris clone as proof of their abilities. Perri was impressed with the game and, alongside Raúl Gomila, hired them as well as a fourth developer (whose name is currently unknown) to create the game, with Hernández acting as the main programmer, González composing the music, and González, Pérez, and the fourth developer working on the graphics.

In 1993, Perri showcased Action 52 at the International Winter Consumer Electronics Show. He claimed to have raised $5 million for the multicart from private backers in Europe and Saudi Arabia. The developers, who used an Atari ST, were given three months to complete Action 52, leaving little time for playtesting and fixing bugs. Technical work was contracted out to Cronos Engineering, Inc., a Boca Raton company who had previously done work for IBM. González, one of the programmers, says that Action 52s developers were flown to Salt Lake City, Utah, where they were trained for a week on using an NES development kit by a video game company, the name of which he does not remember. However, he does recall that the company was developing an NES adaptation of Star Wars: Episode V—The Empire Strikes Back; this would identify the company as Sculptured Software. Corroborating this is Action 52s use of Sculptured Software's NES music engine. Several pieces of music in the NES version of Action 52 were plagiarized from sample music composed by Ed Bogas for The Music Studio, published by Activision for the Atari ST. The games with plagiarized music include Fuzz Power, Silver Sword, French Baker, Streemerz, Time Warp Tickers and Ninja Assault. González also confirms that, in addition to many unused tiles, Action 52 has 8 extra game templates, because the distributor configured the cartridges to contain 60 games by default.

According to González, the gaming press's characterization of Action 52 as a "scam" is incorrect. He says that Perri, inspired by his neighborhood's reaction to the Taiwanese compilation, fully intended, at least in the beginning, to create and market a legitimate multicart. However, Perri knew little about the video game business when he launched his venture, and as a result made serious errors, such as entrusting the project to programmers who had too little experience, and giving them an insufficient length of time to develop Action 52. Perri's expectation that the multicart would launch a multimedia Cheetahmen franchise was similarly not well-founded, given the game's low quality.

The Sega Genesis version of Action 52 was developed by FarSight Technologies, under the direction of Jay Obernolte, using a Macintosh LC. FarSight's experienced programmers, along with the returning Pérez and Hernández  (González opted not to participate, in order to spend more time with his girlfriend, whom he would eventually marry), were allowed to spend a year developing this version. FarSight insisted that Active Enterprises playtest it before its release; thus, the resulting multicart had far fewer glitches than the NES version released two years before. Mark Steven Miller and Jason Scher of Nu Romantic Productions composed the music for the Genesis version, in 48 hours.

A version of the game for the SNES was planned for release in October 1993 but was canceled. Active Enterprises also planned to have FarSight develop another multicart titled Sports 5, but Active folded without releasing either game soon after, and no copies of them are known to exist.

Prototype cartridges
Two different kinds of NES Action 52 prototype cartridges are known to have been produced. Prototype I, made first, has a blue circuit board inside a transparent case, with a solid blue label. Prototype II has a transparent case as well, with a black circuit board and a transparent label. Active Enterprises is embossed on the underside of the cartridge. The Prototype II cartridges, like the original prototype, are the only two versions that do not have capacitors. The final cartridges released for sale feature a green circuit board and either blue or orange capacitors as these were used to bypass the "lockout" function of the Nintendo Entertainment System console. As published by the 4th, original, developer of the Action 52 game; only two known copies of the original prototype I cartridge are known to exist. It is unknown how many of the Prototype II cartridges exist, but the research by Greg Pabich indicates that they were a test batch and are likely very rare.

As may be expected, the software on the prototype cartridges is in an even less finished state than that on the released cartridges. The biggest difference is that the game The Cheetahmen is missing from the prototypes, which instead include a different game, titled Action Gamer, as the 52nd game. It has only two levels, one of which is incomplete, and appears to be an abandoned initial attempt to create a Cheetahmen game (The Cheetahmen includes a character named the Action Gamemaster in its introductory sequence). Action Gamer was not put aside entirely, however; it was reworked into Ooze (the fifth game of the multicart). Most of the other differences between the prototypes and the released product are minor, such as menu screens that have generic headers and footers in the prototypes, as well as game title text that varies from the final version, and menu backgrounds in different colors. The menu template of the prototypes is identical to that of other, illegal multicarts containing 52 pirated games, indicating that the code for Action 52 is based on the code for the pirate multicarts.

In 2010, a Prototype I cartridge surfaced. While Action 52 was in development, Perri had asked movie and video game distributor Greg Pabich to be a partner in Active Enterprises. Pabich turned Perri down, for several reasons, but kept one of the Prototype I cartridges. It was stored in Pabich's warehouse for over twenty years before it was rediscovered. Pabich had the ROM data for Action Gamer stripped from the cartridge, and the game's code completed. He released the result as Cheetahmen: The Creation on November 11, 2011; boxed, red game cartridges, in a limited edition of 1,000, came with a reproduction of the Cheetahmen comic book that had been included with Action 52. A "Special Collector's Edition" was also sold; in addition to the cartridge (in green instead of red) and the comic book, an additional, boxed, sealed cartridge (with a transparent case), a music CD, a T-shirt, and a poster were included. This edition was limited to 500.

In August 2012, another Prototype I cartridge was put up for auction on eBay, along with its original box, marked "SAMPLE—Not for sale—Demonstration purposes only". Various rare Action 52 promotional materials were included as well. The seller started a blog, in which he identified himself as "Action 52 Developer #4", and related his part in the creation of the multicart. His cartridge and Perri's are the only two examples of Prototype I that are known to still exist.

Reception

Critical reaction to Action 52 has been consistently negative. AllGame editor Skyler Miller described the game as an "unlicensed but legal multicart" containing "NES games of extremely poor quality".

The entirety of Action 52 has also been famously reviewed by internet personality and YouTube content creator James Rolfe (as his persona, the Angry Video Game Nerd) in the 90th episode of the fifth season, which originally aired on YouTube on July 21, 2011. Despite his comedic exaggerations, the review pointed out severe cases of repeating themes, crashing or non-functional games, critical bugs, and misleading titles.

See also

 List of commercial failures in video gaming
 List of video games notable for negative reception
 Caltron 6 in 1
 Cassette 50
 Don't Buy This

References

External links
 List of all Action 52 games — a comprehensive website detailing all 52 of the games in the compilation.
 Active Enterprises exposed — a website with information on both Action 52 and Active Enterprises.
 Cheetahmengames.com  — official website of The Cheetahmen.
 Action52Prototype.com — Action 52 Developer #4's firsthand story of the development of Action 52 and the rare Action 52 prototype NES game cartridge.

Video games scored by Ed Bogas
1991 video games
Cancelled Super Nintendo Entertainment System games
Unauthorized video games
Video game compilations
Nintendo Entertainment System games
North America-exclusive video games
Sega Genesis games
Video games developed in the United States
Video games with alternative versions
FarSight Studios games
Video game memes
Multiplayer and single-player video games